Chen Qi may refer to:
Chen Qi (artist) (born 1956), Chinese/Singaporean oil painting and ink painting artist
Chen Qi (actress), Chinese actress
Chen Qi (baseball), Chinese national baseball team infielder, see China national baseball team
Chen Qi (collector) (1912–2000), Chinese collector of art and antiquities
Chen Qi (Investiture of the Gods), character in Investiture of the Gods, one of Heng Ha Er Jiang
Chen Qi (javelin thrower) (born 1982), Chinese javelin thrower
Chen Qi (table tennis) (born 1983), Chinese table tennis player